Stereocaulon symphycheilum is a species of snow lichen belonging to the family Stereocaulaceae.

Ecology
Stereocaulon symphycheilum is a known host to the lichenicolous fungus species:

 Cercidospora stereocaulorum
 Taeniolella christiansenii

References

Lichen species
Lichens described in 1961
Stereocaulaceae
Taxa named by Elke Mackenzie